Jurong Bird Park was formerly an aviary and tourist attraction in Jurong, Singapore between 1971 and 2023. It is one of the parks managed by Mandai Wildlife Reserve, which are also the managers of Singapore Zoo, Night Safari and River Wonders.

In 2016, the Mandai Wildlife Group announced that the Jurong Bird Park would be relocated to a much larger park at Mandai Lake Road by 2020, consolidating with the three existing wildlife parks together with a new Rainforest Park to form an integrated nature and wildlife precinct known as the Mandai Wildlife Reserve. In 2021, the group announced that the park's successor in Mandai would be named Bird Paradise. In 2022, it was announced that Jurong Bird Park would close on 3 January 2023 to finalise its move to Bird Paradise at Mandai.

History

The idea of a permanent aviary was first conceived by the late Dr Goh Keng Swee, then Minister for Finance, in 1968. During a World Bank meeting in Rio de Janeiro, Dr Goh visited its zoological garden and was impressed with its free-flight aviary. He set out to ensure that Singaporeans would have a place where they could escape from urban life and relax with nature.

Work on the aviary started in January 1969. A 35-acre site on the western slope of Bukit Peropok in Jurong was chosen for the project. The bird park was expected to be completed by the end of 1969.

On 3 January 1971, Jurong Bird Park, built at a cost of S$3.5 million, was opened to the public.

Jurong Bird Park became a world-famous bird zoo holding specimens of magnificent bird life from around the world, including a large flock of flamingos. At the time of its closing in 2023 it was the world's largest bird park in terms of the number of birds, and second largest both in the number of bird species and land area (after Germany's Weltvogelpark Walsrode). There are 5,000 birds of 400 species in Jurong Bird Park, of which 24% are of threatened species, the highest percentage in any zoo worldwide.

In 2006, Jurong Bird Park completed a S$10 million makeover. As a result of the upgrade, the park got a new entrance plaza, a park-owned and managed Bongo Burgers restaurant, an ice cream parlour, a gift shop and a bird hospital.

Potential uses for the Jurong site after the bird park's closure include residential or recreational space. Memorable features such as the waterfall are expected to be retained.

Animals and exhibits

Penguin Coast

An upgrade of the old Penguin Parade habitat. African penguins live in an outdoor pool meant to recreate a South African coastline with artificially created waves on the lagoon. Inside a Portuguese galleon facade, a climate-controlled enclosure kept at 10-15 °C houses sub-Antarctic penguins.
 African penguin
 Gentoo penguin
 Humboldt penguin
 King penguin
 Northern rockhopper penguin

Flamingo Pool
 American flamingo
 Lesser flamingo

Flamingo Lake
 Greater flamingo

Wings of Asia
500 birds from 135 species are housed in this aviary. The aviary houses and has successfully bred many endangered birds, including the Bali mynah, black-winged starling and Santa Cruz ground dove.

 Asian fairy-bluebird
 Asian glossy starling
 Bali myna
 Bank myna
 Baya weaver
 Barred cuckoo-dove
 Black-breasted thrush
 Black-naped fruit dove
 Black-winged starling
 Blossom-headed parakeet
 Blue-backed tanager
 Blue-crowned laughingthrush
 Blue-rumped parrot
 Blue-winged pitta
 Blue-winged leafbird
 Bronze-tailed peacock-pheasant
 Chinese bamboo partridge
 Cinnamon ground dove
 Chinese hwamei
 Common blackbird
 Crested fireback
 Crested partridge
 Crestless fireback
 Edwards's pheasant
 Fire-tufted barbet
 Golden-crested myna
 Great argus
 Green broadbill
 Green peafowl
 Grey-backed thrush
 Grey junglefowl
 Grey peacock-pheasant
 Jambu fruit dove
 Lesser mouse-deer
 Malayan peacock-pheasant
 Masked lapwing
 Mindanao bleeding-heart
 Mountain peacock-pheasant
 Nicobar pigeon
 Opal-rumped tanager
 Orange-spotted bulbul
 Papuan king parrot
 Pied imperial pigeon
 Pink-necked green pigeon
 Red-billed leiothrix
 Red-breasted parakeet
 Red-vented bulbul
 Red-whiskered bulbul
 Santa Cruz ground dove
 Sclater's crowned pigeon
 Siamese fireback
 Spotted imperial pigeon
 Straw-headed bulbul
 Sulawesi ground dove
 Superb fruit dove
 Tawny frogmouth
 Thick-billed green pigeon
 White-crested laughingthrush
 White-necklaced partridge
 Yellow-faced myna
 Zebra dove

Outside of the Wings of Asia aviary are enclosures for black-necked storks and Cape Barren geese.

Heliconia Walk
The Jurong Bird Park has the largest collection of Heliconias in Southeast Asia with over 167 species. Many different aviaries house a variety of rare birds like:

 Amazonian motmot
 Black-breasted thrush
 Brahminy starling
 Chestnut-eared aracari
 Common blackbird
 Common green magpie
 Green broadbill
 Java sparrow
 Mindanao bleeding-heart
 Mountain bamboo partridge
 Mountain peacock-pheasant
 Pompadour cotinga
 Red-fronted barbet
 Red-legged honeycreeper
 Ruddy quail-dove
 Saffron finch
 Silver-beaked tanager
 Silver-eared mesia
 Spangled cotinga
 Speckled mousebird
 Sulawesi ground dove
 Tambourine dove
 Turquoise tanager
 Western bronze-naped pigeon
 White-eared bulbul
 White-eared catbird
 White-necklaced partridge
 White-shouldered starling

Wetlands
Guests can observe a variety of waterfowl, ibises, spoonbills and more. A wave machine prevents the build-up of algae in the water. A large aviary housing scarlet ibises is inaccessible to guests but is visible from the path.

 Abdim's stork
 Baer's pochard
 Bar-headed goose
 Black-bellied whistling duck
 Black-faced spoonbill
 Black-headed ibis
 Blue-billed teal
 Boat-billed heron
 Brazilian teal
 Cattle egret
 Cinnamon teal
 Crested myna
 Eurasian spoonbill
 Hamerkop
 Indian pied myna
 Lesser adjutant
 Long-tailed mockingbird
 Meller's duck
 Nene
 Northern bald ibis
 Roseate spoonbill
 Scarlet ibis
 Shoebill
 Straw-necked ibis
 White-faced whistling duck
 White-winged duck
 Wood duck

Royal Ramble

 Blue-bellied roller
 Blue-grey tanager
 Blue ground dove
 Blue-tailed imperial pigeon
 Cobalt-winged parakeet
 Crested pigeon
 Crested quail-dove
 Dusky turtle dove
 Lemon dove
 Malagasy turtle dove
 Maranon pigeon
 Metallic pigeon
 Mountain bamboo partridge
 Pale-capped pigeon
 Pearly parakeet
 Pink-bellied imperial pigeon
 Pink-headed imperial pigeon
 Pinon's imperial pigeon
 Red-crested cardinal
 Ruddy quail-dove
 Silver-beaked tanager
 Silver-tipped imperial pigeon
 Southern screamer
 Victoria crowned pigeon
 White-crowned pigeon
 White-eared bulbul
 White-lined tanager
 Yellow-hooded blackbird

Window on Paradise

This building has three free-flight aviaries for birds-of-paradise.
 Green oropendola
 Lesser bird-of-paradise
 Malayan peacock-pheasant
 Raggiana bird-of-paradise
 Victoria crowned pigeon
 Western crowned pigeon

Hornbills and Toucans
The area consists of 27 large aviaries containing the world's largest collection of hornbills and a few species of toucans. The Jurong Bird Park is the first to successfully breed the black hornbill in captivity.

 African grey hornbill
 Black hornbill
 Black-casqued hornbill
 Great hornbill
 Long-billed hornbill
 Luzon hornbill
 Oriental pied hornbill
 Papuan hornbill
 Red-billed toucan
 Rhinoceros hornbill
 Rufous hornbill
 Silvery-cheeked hornbill
 Southern ground hornbill
 Sulawesi hornbill
 Toco toucan
 Trumpeter hornbill
 Von der Decken's hornbill
 White-crowned hornbill
 Wreathed hornbill
 Wrinkled hornbill

African Treetops
This walkthrough aviary stimulates the canopy layer of a rainforest and features various birds from the rainforests of Africa. It has a few elevated walkways and a suspension bridge to provide an immersive experience. Some of the species housed in this aviary include various species of glossy-starlings and turacos. The African Treetops aviary was formerly the Lory Loft, which was moved to the former Jungle Jewels site.

 Abdim's stork
 African olive pigeon
 Ashy starling
 Bearded barbet
 Black-bellied whistling duck
 Black-spotted barbet
 Bruce's green pigeon
 Chestnut-bellied starling
 Crowned hornbill
 Emerald starling
 Golden-breasted starling
 Great blue turaco
 Greater blue-eared starling
 Grey crowned crane
 Grey parrot
 Guinea turaco
 Hartlaub's turaco
 Laughing dove
 Lesser blue-eared starling
 Livingstone's turaco
 Long-tailed glossy starling
 Magpie goose
 Northern red-billed hornbill
 Purple starling
 Red-and-yellow barbet
 Red-billed blue magpie
 Red-winged starling
 Rüppell's starling
 Speckled pigeon
 Splendid starling
 Superb starling
 Vieillot's black weaver
 Violet-backed starling
 Violet turaco
 Von der Decken's hornbill
 White-cheeked turaco
 White-crested turaco
 White-faced whistling duck

Lory Loft
Guests can feed 10 species of lorikeets and lories. The attraction was chosen as a "Top 10 Best Family Experience" by the Singapore Tourism Board.

 Australian king parrot
 Bar-shouldered dove
 Black-capped lory
 Blue-faced honeyeater
 Blue-streaked lory
 Blue-winged kookaburra
 Chattering lory
 Coconut lorikeet
 Crested pigeon
 Dusky lory
 Iris lorikeet
 Marigold lorikeet
 Ornate lorikeet
 Palm cockatoo
 Pesquet's parrot
 Purple-naped lory
 Rainbow lorikeet
 Red-billed blue magpie
 Scaly-breasted lorikeet
 Sunset lorikeet
 Western crowned pigeon
 Wonga pigeon
 Yellow-bibbed lory

Birds of Prey
A series of large aviaries that house different species of birds of prey. On 27 November 2019, a pair of critically endangered Philippine eagles named Geothermica and Sambisig were sent to the park as part of a recovery programme.
 Andean condor
 Hooded vulture
 King vulture
 Marabou stork
 Palm nut vulture
 Philippine eagle
 White-backed vulture
 White-headed vulture

Dinosaur Descendants
Larger ground-dwelling birds such as ratites and cranes are housed in this area. Around the enclosures are four huts containing interactive displays like elephant bird egg replicas and a cassowary's casque as well as a dig site play area for children where they can excavate dinosaur fossils.
 Northern cassowary
 Saddle-billed stork
 Sarus crane
 Southern cassowary

Pelican Cove
Multiple species of pelicans are featured in this pond. It is also the world's first pelican underwater viewing gallery.
 Australian pelican
 Dalmatian pelican
 Great white pelican
 Pink-backed pelican
 Spot-billed pelican

Parrot Paradise

Located at the far north of the park, this 2.47 acre (1 ha) complex contains several species of parrots from Australia, Asia and South America.

 Black-headed caique
 Blue-eyed cockatoo
 Blue-headed macaw
 Blue-headed parrot
 Blue-throated macaw
 Blue-winged kookaburra
 Blue-winged macaw
 Burrowing owl
 Burrowing parrot
 Chaco chachalaca
 Chestnut-eared aracari
 Common bronzewing
 Dusky parrot
 Eclectus parrot
 Galah
 Golden conure
 Great curassow
 Great green macaw
 Greater vasa parrot
 Grey parrot
 Hyacinth macaw
 Laughing kookaburra
 Moluccan king parrot
 Monk parakeet
 Pileated parrot
 Red-and-green macaw
 Red-bellied macaw
 Red-crowned amazon
 Red-fan parrot
 Red-fronted macaw
 Red-shouldered macaw
 Salmon-crested cockatoo
 Scarlet macaw
 Sun parakeet
 Timneh parrot
 White cockatoo
 Yellow-shouldered amazon

Waterfall Aviary

The Waterfall Aviary is 2 hectares in area and 35 meters tall, and has one of the world's tallest man-made waterfalls. At the time of its construction in the early 1970s the Waterfall Aviary was the world's largest aviary with the world's tallest man-made aviary. Guests cross a suspended bridge to watch the many different birds. It houses a large variety of birds including grey crowned cranes, roseate spoonbills and several passerines.

 African green pigeon
 African sacred ibis
 American white ibis
 Black crowned crane
 Black-naped oriole
 Blue-bellied roller
 Blue-grey tanager
 Blue-throated piping guan
 Common hill myna
 Crested guineafowl
 Eared dove
 Eclectus parrot
 European roller
 Indian peafowl
 Laughing dove
 Long-tailed mockingbird
 Masked lapwing
 Milky stork
 Nicobar pigeon
 Pied imperial pigeon
 Pink-necked green pigeon
 Purple starling
 Red-billed blue magpie
 Red-breasted parakeet
 Red-crested cardinal
 Red-whiskered bulbul
 Roseate spoonbill
 Rose-ringed parakeet
 Scarlet macaw
 Spotted whistling duck
 Stock dove
 Superb starling
 Tanimbar corella
 Taveta weaver
 Village weaver
 White-crested laughingthrush
 White-crowned robin-chat
 White-fronted amazon
 Yellow-crowned bishop

Shows
The "High Flyers Show" showcases the natural abilities and skills of various different birds including their yellow-naped amazon named Amigo who can sing in three different languages and many other birds. At the end of the show, visitors are allowed to take pictures with a flock of pelicans and flamingos.

The "Kings of the Skies Show" features the park's birds of prey.

Awards
Awarded to Jurong Bird Park:
 Michelin 2-star rating, 2008
 Conservation & Research Award, International Symposium on Breeding Birds in Captivity, 2006 and 2007
 Excellence Award, Association of Southeast Asian Nations Tourism Association, 2004 and 2007
 Best Loved Pro-Family Business, Singapore, 2006
 Superstar Winner of the Excellent Service Awards, Singapore Tourism Board, 2004
 Tourism Host of the Year, Singapore Tourism Board, 2003
 Breeders Award, American Pheasant and Waterfowl Society, 2001
 Highly Commended, Tourism For Tomorrow International Awards, 1993
 First Breeders Award by the American Pheasant & Waterfowl Society, 2001

Transportation
Throughout its existence, Jurong Bird Park was never directly served by any MRT line, with the nearest station being Boon Lay MRT station.

There is a bus service operated by SBS Transit which calls at the bus stop outside the park.

The park itself was once served by the Jurong Bird Park Panorail a 1.7-kilometre (1.1 mi) loop monorail system which ran within the park. The system was constructed by Vonroll Transport Systems of Switzerland, which also built the Sentosa Monorail and Singapore Cable Car. The monorail system used four fully air-conditioned four-car trains which travelled around the park in approximately 11 minutes. It has since ceased operations in 2012 and was replaced by a trackless tram service similar to the ones found at the Singapore Zoo and Night Safari.

Gallery

See also

 Gardens by the Bay, Singapore
 Night Safari, Singapore
 River Wonders, Singapore
 Singapore Botanic Gardens
 Singapore Zoo

References

Bibliography

External links
 

 
Tourist attractions in Singapore
Aviaries
1971 establishments in Singapore
2023 disestablishments in Singapore
Boon Lay
Bird parks